Nduduzo Sibiya (born 2 June 1995) is a South African soccer player who plays as a midfielder for Lamontville Golden Arrows F.C. He made his international debut for South Africa in 2017.

References

1995 births
Living people
South African soccer players
Association football midfielders
Lamontville Golden Arrows F.C. players
African Warriors F.C. players
South Africa international soccer players
South African Premier Division players
National First Division players
Soccer players from Durban